Chromium fluoride may refer to:

 Chromium(II) fluoride, a blue-green iridescent solid
 Chromium(III) fluoride, a green crystalline solid
 Chromium(IV) fluoride, a dark greenish-black color when solid
 Chromium(V) fluoride, a red volatile solid
 Chromium(VI) fluoride, a hypothetical chemical compound